Rose Park may refer to:
 Rose Park, South Australia, a suburb of Adelaide, South Australia, Australia
 Rose Park, Long Beach, California, a neighborhood in Long Beach, California, United States
 Rose Park, Salt Lake City, Utah, a neighborhood in Salt Lake City, Utah, United States

See also
 E. S. Rose Park, a sports venue in Nashville, Tennessee, United States
 Roseanne Park or Rosé, member of the South Korean girl group Blackpink
 Rosa Parks (disambiguation)